"All for Jesus, All for Jesus", also titled as "All for Jesus! All for Jesus!"  and originally titled "For the Love of Jesus", is an English Christian hymn. It was written in 1887 by W J Sparrow Simpson intended as the closing chorus of John Stainer's "The Crucifixion" oratorio. It started to be published as a separate hymn later in 1901.

History 
In 1887, Sparrow Simpson was the Church of England curate of Christ Church in Marylebone, London. He wrote "All for Jesus, All for Jesus" for The Crucifixion, where he had initially titled it "For the Love of Jesus". It was written as a "meditation on the Passion of the Holy Redeemer" with scriptural references from the New Testament. The music for the hymn was written by Stainer, with the piece being titled "All for Jesus". The hymn was intended as a closing chorus and also to be a part of The Crucifixion set aside for congregational singing. The hymn was first performed in public at St Marylebone Parish Church on Ash Wednesday in 1887. After its first performance, "The Crucifixion" was praised in The Churchman as being "...a first and a very successful attempt to supply an easy and short form of Passion music suitable for use in ordinary parish churches," though Stainer had previously described the whole oratorio as "rubbish".

For several years, "All for Jesus, All for Jesus" was played only as part of The Crucifixion performances. In 1969 it was first published as a standalone hymn in the Methodist hymnal Hymns and Songs. From there it has been published as an independent hymn across Christian denominations. In Roman Catholic hymnals, an additional verse is included supporting the Catholic doctrine of transubstantiation despite Sparrow Simpson being a member of the Church of England, which rejected that doctrine in the Thirty-Nine Articles.

Scripture 
"All for Jesus, All for Jesus" Matthew 19:21, Matthew 22:37, John 8:36, Romans 8:38–39, Romans 12:1, 1 Corinthians 2:2 and Ephesians 5:2.

References 

English Christian hymns
1887 songs
Songs about Jesus
19th-century hymns
Compositions by John Stainer